Parker Land Kligerman (born August 8, 1990) is an American professional stock car racing driver and a pit reporter for NASCAR on NBC. He competes full-time in the NASCAR Xfinity Series, driving the No. 48 Chevrolet Camaro for Big Machine Racing and part-time in the NASCAR Craftsman Truck Series, driving the No. 75 Chevrolet Silverado for Henderson Motorsports. Kligerman is a former development driver for Team Penske. He has worked for NBC since 2015 after he lost his full-time ride in the NASCAR Cup Series with the closed Swan Racing team in 2014.

Racing career
As part of Penske's driver development program, in 2008 Kligerman drove the No. 77 Cunningham Motorsports Dodge in two races in the ARCA RE/MAX Series. He drove the car full-time in 2009, finishing second in points in his rookie season. He made his Nationwide Series debut for Penske in their No. 22 car at Kansas Speedway that year and won the pole. He then drove in the season finale for Team 42 Racing.

He was slated to contest the first five races of the 2010 NASCAR Nationwide Series season with Team 42 with additional appearances possible. However, he failed to qualify at Daytona and Bristol. After missing the show at Bristol he was out of the car until returning for the eighth race of the season at Talladega where he crashed on lap 113. He earned his first Top 10 finish at Bristol's second race with a ninth-place finish. Kligerman also earned a top ten with an 8th-place finish at Circuit Gilles Villeneuve.

Kligerman competed for Rookie of the Year in the NASCAR Camping World Truck Series in 2011, driving the No. 29 Ram for Brad Keselowski Racing. He returned to the No. 29 truck in 2012, and also drove the Penske Racing No. 22 in the Nationwide Series on a limited schedule, sharing the seat with Brad Keselowski and Jacques Villeneuve.

After the first eleven races of the 2012 season, Kligerman was released from his ride at Brad Keselowski Racing. Shortly thereafter, Red Horse Racing announced that they had signed a contract with Kligerman to drive the No. 7 Toyota for the remainder of the season.

Kligerman practiced and qualified the No. 22 Dodge for Penske Racing at Michigan International Speedway in the Sprint Cup Series in August 2012, as regular driver Sam Hornish Jr. competed in the Nationwide Series race at Circuit Gilles Villeneuve that weekend, returning for the race.

Kligerman won his first Camping World Truck Series race at Talladega Superspeedway on October 6, 2012. A fringe title contender late in the season, Kligerman was officially eliminated from championship contention after being involved in a crash at Phoenix and finishing in 27th place. The next week he would make his final start for Red Horse Racing in the 2012 season finale at Homestead-Miami Speedway, winning his second career pole and finishing in 7th place. He finished 5th in the series points standings.

Announcing that he would not be returning to Red Horse Racing or the Camping World Truck Series in 2013, Kligerman signed with Kyle Busch Motorsports to drive their No. 77 Toyota Camry in the NASCAR Nationwide Series full-time in 2013. He disappointed at KBM, only finishing in the top 5 three times and ending the year 9th in points.

In November 2013, Kligerman made his Sprint Cup debut at Texas Motor Speedway in the AAA Texas 500, driving for Swan Racing. He finished 18th in the event, Swan's best result in 2013.  Two weekends later, at the Ford 400, Kligerman impressed again by finishing 25th, on the lead lap.

For 2014, Swan Racing announced Kligerman's hiring for the full 2014 season, as part of an expansion to two full-time teams, alongside Cole Whitt. During a practice session for the 2014 Daytona 500, Kligerman was involved in an accident that saw his car overturned into the catch fencing, but was uninjured.

Due to sponsorship woes and on track struggles including many DNFs and wrecked race cars in the first eight races, Swan was forced to sell off both of its teams prior to Richmond, with the No. 30 points being bought by Xxxtreme Motorsport, who already had a driver in J. J. Yeley. Thus, Kligerman was without a ride. However, Swan continued to keep Kligerman under contract for the remainder of the year in the event they would resume operations. On May 14, Stewart-Haas Racing announced that Kligerman would serve as a practice and stand-by driver for Kurt Busch in the No. 41 at the Sprint All-Star Race and Coca-Cola 600 when Busch was attempting the 600-Indianapolis 500 "Double Duty". Kligerman began working with NBC Sports Network (NBCSN) as an analyst later in the 2014 season. In September, he announced that he would test an Indy Lights car for Schmidt Peterson Motorsports.

In 2015, Kligerman continued his work with NBCSN, including commentary on tape-delayed broadcasts of the K&N Pro Series. At Darlington in September, he returned to competition, driving the No. 97 Chevrolet for Obaika Racing in the Xfinity Series.

On February 3, 2016, it was announced that Kligerman would drive the No. 92 Ford F-150 for RBR Enterprises at Daytona in the Truck Series. In July, Kligerman joined Athenian Motorsports for the Truck race at Kentucky, replacing an injured John Wes Townley. Before the Martinsville race, Kligerman and RBR mutually parted ways leaving Kligerman without a ride. Kligerman was called upon to drive the No. 75 Toyota for Henderson Motorsports at Talladega. Kligerman would not make the race, after sustaining a brake issue during qualifying.

In 2017, Kligerman returned to Henderson Motorsports to run 8–10 races in addition to serving as a Cup Series and Xfinity Series pit reporter for NBC Sports. After starting the year with a DNQ at Daytona, Kligerman won at the schedule's second plate track Talladega in October.

After three years out of the series, in May 2018, Kligerman joined Gaunt Brothers Racing for his Cup Series return in the Coca-Cola 600. In 2019, he ran 14 races for GBR, recording a best finish of 15th in the Daytona 500 and 1000Bulbs.com 500. He did not return to the team in 2020.

Despite not returning to the Cup series in 2020, Kligerman would rejoin Henderson for 10 Truck series starts that year in the No. 75 Silverado, failing to qualify for his first two attempts, but successfully making the field at his other attempts. He would run well, with his worst finish being a 34th at Dover due to his engine giving out after 94 laps, and his best fishing being 4th at Bristol.

Kiligerman would increase his truck schedule from 10 races to 12 races in 2021. He would get two top fives at Watkins Glen and Darlington. He would also rejoin Gaunt Brothers Racing for the Fall Kansas Race, where he managed to bring the 96 to a 20th-place finish. Kligerman said that the car was one of the best Cup cars he has ever driven.

On December 27, 2021, in a response to a fan's tweet, Kligerman revealed that he would return to Henderson Motorsports to drive the No. 75 truck in 8 to 12 races in 2022.

On July 9, 2022, in the O'Reilly Auto Parts 150 at Mid-Ohio, Kligerman earned his third victory in the Truck Series, which was also a decisive win against Zane Smith.

On October 29, 2022, Big Machine Racing announced that Kligerman would drive the No. 48 car full time in the 2023 Xfinity Series season.

Personal life
Kligerman was born in Greenwich and lived in Stamford until he was 11 then moved to neighboring Westport, Connecticut where he stayed there until his move to NASCAR. Kligerman is the co-founder and president of Focus Now Solutions, the manufacturer of focus-enhancing beverage product Focus7 Shot. Kligerman also is a writer at auto blog Jalopnik, as well as at NBCSports.com, and produced a weekly podcast called "Kickin' it with Kligerman" March 2014 to January 2015.

Since 2019, Kligerman has been represented professionally by Athelo Group, a sports agency based out of Stamford, Connecticut.

He graduated from Staples High School in his hometown of Westport, Connecticut in 2009.

Kligerman currently lives in Stamford.

Motorsports career results

NASCAR
(key) (Bold – Pole position awarded by qualifying time. Italics – Pole position earned by points standings or practice time. * – Most laps led.)

Cup Series

Daytona 500

Xfinity Series

Craftsman Truck Series

 Season still in progress
 Ineligible for series points

ARCA Racing Series
(key) (Bold – Pole position awarded by qualifying time. Italics – Pole position earned by points standings or practice time. * – Most laps led.)

References

External links
 
 

Living people
1990 births
People from Westport, Connecticut
Sportspeople from Fairfield County, Connecticut
Racing drivers from Connecticut
NASCAR drivers
ARCA Menards Series drivers
Staples High School alumni
Team Penske drivers
Kyle Busch Motorsports drivers
Chip Ganassi Racing drivers